Jotron Arena Larvik is an indoor arena in Larvik, Norway. It was opened in September 2009. The arena will be primarily used for handball, but the hall has additional permanent floor marks for basketball, volleyball and floorball. 

Starting in September 2009, Arena Larvik will be the home court of Larvik HK. It is also one of the Norwegian venues selected to host the 2010 European Women's Handball Championship.

The former name was Boligmappa Arena Larvik.

References

External links 
 

Larvik
Handball venues in Norway
Indoor arenas in Norway
Basketball venues in Norway
Volleyball venues in Norway